Sam Chapman (born 16 February 1989) is a British speedway rider who in 2015  rode for Plymouth Devils in the Premier League and Birmingham Brummies in the National League.

Career
Born in Cornwall, Chapman competed in Motocross before later switching to Speedway. He was given his first regular team place by the Scunthorpe Stags in the National League in 2014. Starting on a standard 3.00 average he finished the season on a much improved 5.45 average, riding at number 1 for the Stags in what was a disappointing season for the team.

After a successful first season in the National League Chapman swapped the struggling Stags team for the newly reformed Birmingham Brummies, a team tipped by many to mount a serious title challenge. He was also given the opportunity to double up and combine riding for the Brummies with riding with local team the Plymouth Devils in the Premier League, as a pre-season replacement for Hungarian rider Roland Benko who had to withdraw due to personal reasons.

References

1989 births
Living people
English motorcycle racers
British speedway riders
Birmingham Brummies riders
Sportspeople from Truro